Gorgythion is a genus of skippers in the family Hesperiidae.

Species
Recognised species in the genus Gorgythion include:
 Gorgythion begga (Prittwitz, 1868)
 Gorgythion beggina Mabille, 1897
 Gorgythion plautia (Möschler, [1877])

References

Erynnini
Hesperiidae genera
Taxa named by Frederick DuCane Godman
Taxa named by Osbert Salvin